Hollywood or Bust is a 1956 American semi-musical comedy film starring the team of Dean Martin and Jerry Lewis.  The picture was filmed from April 16 to June 19, 1956, and released on December 6, 1956, by Paramount Pictures, almost five months after the Martin and Lewis partnership split up.

Plot
Malcolm Smith wins a brand new automobile (a 1956 Chrysler New Yorker convertible) at a movie theatre raffle. Steve Wiley, a gambler from New York, obtains a counterfeit of the winning ticket and also claims that the car is his. The theatre manager declares them both winners and that they can split the car any way that they want.  Steve needs to sell the car to pay off a gambling debt, but Malcolm wants to drive it to Hollywood to meet actress Anita Ekberg.

Steve claims to know Ekberg, and agrees to drive to Hollywood with Malcolm, secretly planning to steal the car. Malcolm brings along his dog, a huge Great Dane named Mr. Bascomb who foils Steve in his many attempts to make off with the car.

Along the way they pick up Terry, an aspiring dancer, who has a job waiting for her  in Las Vegas.  Once there, Malcolm gets his "lucky feeling" and wins $10,000 ($ today) at a casino.  In addition, the woman of his dreams, Anita Ekberg, is also at the hotel and Malcolm finally gets to meet her, with hilarious results.

Steve begins to show a change of heart. He not only agrees to go along with Malcolm to Hollywood without stealing the car, but he also proposes to Terry.

Malcolm spoils the mood by telling them that he no longer has any of his casino winnings, having used it on a gift for Anita.  Steve decides to retrieve the gift and they head to Paramount Pictures to locate her.  After some back-lot adventures, they find Anita, who agrees to return the gift in exchange for the services of Mr. Bascomb in her next movie.

Cast

Dean Martin as Steve Wiley
Jerry Lewis as Malcolm Smith
Pat Crowley as Terry Roberts
Maxie Rosenbloom as Bookie Benny
Anita Ekberg as herself
Richard Alexander as Western actor
Adelle August as Dancer
Chet Brandenburg as Stagehand 
Kathryn Card as Elderly lady
Franklyn Farnum as Audience member
Joe Gray as Gambler
Richard Karlan as Sammy Ross
Deana Martin as 7-year-old girl
Torben Meyer as Waiter
Wendell Niles as himself
Suzanne Ridgway as Woman at craps table
Charles Sullivan as Audience member
Willard Waterman as Manager Neville
Ben Welden as Boss
Frank Wilcox as Director
Chief Yowlachie as Chief Running Water
Beach Dickerson as Bellboy (uncredited)
Minta Durfee as Miss Pettywood (uncredited)

Production

Filming
This was the last film that Jerry Lewis and Dean Martin appeared in together. According to Lewis in his autobiography Dean and Me, he and Martin did not speak to each other off-camera during the entire film shoot. In addition, Lewis claimed that this was the only one of his films that he had never seen, citing it as too painful to watch.

The service station scenes were filmed on Live Oak Street in Thousand Oaks, California.

Home media
The film was included on a five-film DVD set, the Dean Martin and Jerry Lewis Collection: Volume Two, released on June 5, 2007.

Legacy

In Paramount's film The Godfather (1972), a scene of the Las Vegas strip, including a shot of the Sands Hotel marquee showing an appearance by Martin and Lewis, was taken from this film.

In Paramount's musical film Grease (1978), during the drive-in theater scene, a clip of the theatrical trailer for the film is shown, as projected on the drive-in's screen.

See also
 List of American films of 1956

References

External links
 
 
 

1956 films
1956 comedy films
American buddy films
American comedy road movies
1950s comedy road movies
1950s buddy comedy films
1950s English-language films
Films directed by Frank Tashlin
Films produced by Hal B. Wallis
Films scored by Walter Scharf
Films set in the Las Vegas Valley
Films set in Los Angeles
Paramount Pictures films
1950s American films